The Laundry and Dry Cleaning International Union is an AFL–CIO union in the United States. Based in Oakland, California, it was created as an alternative to the Laundry Workers International Union, which had been expelled from the AFL–CIO in 1958 for corruption. Russell Crowell was president of the new union from 1962 to 1983.

The organization merged with the Service Employees International Union in 1999, at which time it had 11,000 members.

See also

 Laundry Workers Industrial Union

External links
 Television interview with union member Tacolia (?) McDaniel and president Russell Crowell, 1963, about union and nonunion wages in the industry (starting at 13:05)

References

Dry cleaning
Defunct trade unions in the United States
Service Employees International Union
Laundry workers' trade unions
Trade unions established in 1958